Singolare is an album by Italian singer Mina, originally distributed back to back with album Plurale.

Track listing

Credits
Mina – vocals
Gianni Ferrio – arranger/conductor in "Devo dirti addio (Pra dizer adeus)" and "Triste"
Tony Mimms – arranger/conductor in "Ancora dolcemente"
Pino Presti – arranger/conductor in "Sognando", "L'ultima volta", "Terre lontane", "Io camminerò" and "Nuda"
Massimo Salerno – arranger/conductor in "Cablo"
Roberto Soffici and Simon Luca – arranger/conductor in "Colpa mia"
Nuccio Rinaldis – sound engineer

Mina (Italian singer) albums
1976 albums
Albums conducted by Pino Presti
Albums arranged by Pino Presti